Kulig (sleigh rides) is an old Polish winter tradition dating back to the days of the szlachta (nobility).

The kulig was a sleigh ride party organized among the Polish aristocracy. A cavalcade of horse-pulled sleighs and sleds went from one manor house to another, entertained everywhere with hearty meals followed by dancing.

Nowadays Kulig rides are a popular tourist attraction in the Polish Tatra mountains, advertised and practiced in places such as Zakopane.

References

External links
 Kulig - old Polish winter tradition at Polish News, 2002. Retrieved December 13, 2012.

Polish traditions